Hart-Rouge are a Canadian folk music group, consisting of siblings Paul Campagne, Michelle Campagne, and Suzanne Campagne.

The three previously recorded and performed with several other family members as Folle Avoine, and formed Hart-Rouge with another sibling, Annette Campagne, when that band ended. Annette left the band in the mid-1990s.

The band perform traditional folk songs and original material in both English and French. They have also recorded some material in Canadian First Nations languages.

Their sister Carmen Campagne also continued a career in music, performing independently as a children's entertainer. Their father, Émile Campagne, has also released 2 albums of traditional folk songs.

Originally from Willow Bunch, Saskatchewan, the Campagne family are among the most notable Fransaskois personalities in Canada. Hart-Rouge was the original name of their hometown.

The band is currently based in Montreal.

Discography
Albums
 Hart-Rouge (1988)
 Inconditionnel (1990)
 Le dernier mois de l'année (1992)
 Blue Blue Windows (1993)
 La fabrique (1994)
 Bonsoir Québec (1995)
 Beaupré's Home (1997)
 Nouvelle-France (1998)
 Une histoire de famille (1998)
 J'ai fait un rêve (2001)

Contributing artist
 Keith Hunter and the Witness for Christ Gospel Choir (1995)
 The Rough Guide to the Music of Canada (2005)

References

Musical groups with year of establishment missing
Musical groups from Saskatchewan
Canadian folk music groups
Family musical groups
Red House Records artists